Juan Manuel Pastoriza (died 1896) was a  Cuban baseball pitcher in the Cuban League. He played from 1889 to 1895 with Club Fé, Aguila de Oro, and Almendares. He was killed in 1896 during the Cuban War of Independence. He was elected to the Cuban Baseball Hall of Fame in 1945.

References

Cuban League players
Almendares (baseball) players
Club Fé players
1896 deaths